Marcos Paulo Alves da Costa (born 11 May 1977), known as Marcos Paulo, is a Brazilian former footballer who played as a defensive midfielder. At international level, he represented the Brazil national football team.

Career
Although he had shown great potential as a youngster, after spells with several European clubs, such as Udinese, Sporting CP, and Maccabi Haifa, he found himself back in Brazil playing in the second division. At international level, he played 18 times for the Brazilian national team and scored two goals (this figure includes under-23 games such as the Olympics). On 27 July 2007, he joined J1 League side Yokohama FC on loan, and following Yokohama's relegation from the J1 League, on 28 December of the same year he moved to Shimizu S-Pulse.

Career statistics

Club

International

References

External links
 

 

1977 births
Living people
Brazilian footballers
Brazilian expatriate footballers
Brazil international footballers
Cruzeiro Esporte Clube players
Udinese Calcio players
Serie A players
Expatriate footballers in Italy
Sporting CP footballers
Primeira Liga players
Expatriate footballers in Portugal
FC Metalist Kharkiv players
Ukrainian Premier League players
Grêmio Foot-Ball Porto Alegrense players
Maccabi Haifa F.C. players
Expatriate footballers in Israel
Guarani FC players
Associação Portuguesa de Desportos players
Fortaleza Esporte Clube players
Expatriate footballers in Japan
Yokohama FC players
Shimizu S-Pulse players
J1 League players
1999 Copa América players
1999 FIFA Confederations Cup players
Footballers at the 2000 Summer Olympics
Olympic footballers of Brazil
Expatriate footballers in Ukraine
Copa América-winning players
Brazilian expatriate sportspeople in Ukraine
Association football midfielders